Shri Rudram, is a Vedic mantra or chant in homage to Rudra (an epithet of Shiva) taken from the Krishna Yajurveda's Taittiriya Samhita (TS 4.5, 4.7). It comprises two parts, the Namakam and Chamakam. Chamakam is added by scriptural tradition to the Shri Rudram. The text is important in Shaivism, where Shiva is viewed as the Parabrahman. The hymn is an early example of enumerating the names of a deity.

It also contains the mantra Aum namah bhagavate rudraya and the Mahamrityunjaya Mantra.

The Sri Rudram is commonly chanted during the Pradosha time, which is considered to be a time auspicious for the worship of Shiva.

Contents
Shri Rudram consists of two chapters (praśna) from the fourth kāṇda (book) of Taittiriya Samhita which is a part of Krishna Yajurveda. The names of the chapters are Namakam (chapter five) and Chamakam (chapter seven) respectively. The Namakam (chapter five) in Shri Rudram describes the names or epithets of Rudra, who is a fear-inducing/destructive aspect of Shiva. The devotee asks for the benevolent and graceful aspect of Shiva to be invoked rather than the terrible and fierce aspect of Rudra and requests for the forgiveness of sins. The Chamakam (chapter seven) asks for the fulfillment of wishes. Each chapter consist of eleven anuvākas or hymns.

 Namakam: The Namakam in particular enumerates the various epithets and names of Rudra. It recognises the violent aspects of Rudra and requests him to be benevolent and peaceful, rather than violent and destructive. It also acknowledges the presence of the deity in those from all walks of life, be they carpenters (TS 4.5.1.2) or thieves (TS 4.5.3.2).

 Chamakam: The Chamakam enumerates the various things one would want in life and requests Rudra to grant them to the devotee. It acknowledges both material and spiritual desires and requests the deity for both. Some verses invoke other deities such as Agni and Vishnu and request them to join in the devotee's prayers to Rudra.
The anuvākas or hymns of Namakam correspond to the eleven hymns of TS 4.5, with the final hymn extended by an additional eight verses, including the Mahamrityunjaya Mantra. The mantra Om Namah Shivaya is derived from the Shri Rudram, in which it appears in the verses of TS 4.5.8 though without the syllable Om. The Chamakam consists of 11 anuvākas or hymns.The 11 th anuvāka prayer (of the chamakam), brings out the long list of benedictions asked for in the odd divine number and even human numbering .The anuvākas or hymns of Chamakam correspond to TS 4.7 and they ask God for fulfillment of wishes.

The earliest homage hymns to Rudra is the Śatarudrīya found in the Shukla Yajurveda (Vajasaneyi Samhita 16.1-66). C. Fuller maintains that Shri Rudram is based on Śatarudrīya.

See also
 Mahamrityunjaya Mantra

Notes

References

Sanskrit texts
Shaiva texts
Vedic hymns
Chants